Cashman may refer to:

People
Blake Cashman (born 1996), American football player
Brian Cashman
Chris Cashman
Dan Cashman
David John Cashman
Denis Cashman
Edward Cashman
Jack Cashman
Jay Cashman
Jim Cashman (actor)
Jim Cashman (hurler)
Josephine Cashman, Australian lawyer and entrepreneur
Karen Cashman
Keely Cashman, American alpine skier
John Cashman (disambiguation)
Michael Cashman, member of the UK House of Lords
Mick Cashman
Nellie Cashman
Pat Cashman
Peter L. Cashman
Sean Cashman
Sue Cashman
Terry Cashman
Tom Cashman
Wayne Cashman
Cashman Peters

Places
Cashman, Edmonton, Alberta, Canada
Cashman Center, Las Vegas, Nevada, United States
Cashman Field, adjacent to Cashman Center

Programs
Pat Cashman Show

Other uses
Cashman (computer game)